AAindex is a database of amino acid indices, amino acid mutation matrices, and pair-wise contact potentials. The data represent various physicochemical and biochemical properties of amino acids and pairs of amino acids.

See also 
 Proteinogenic amino acid

References

External links 
 Official AAindex website

Biological databases